Francis Amyot, M.D. was Professor of French and German at Trinity College, Dublin in the late 18th century.

His wife was Mary Stokes: their daughter Mary was born in 1771.

References

Alumni of Trinity College Dublin
Linguists from Ireland
18th-century Irish people